Tafito Lafaele (born 17 February 2001) is a New Zealand rugby union player.

Biography 
Lafaele attended Botany Downs Secondary College where she participated in athletics, volleyball, basketball, netball and sevens. She debuted for Auckland Storm in the 2019 Farah Palmer Cup. In 2021 she played for the Moana Pasifika Sevens team against the Black Ferns and Black Ferns Sevens.

On 3 November 2021, Lafaele was named in the Blues squad for the inaugural Super Rugby Aupiki competition. She was named in the Blues starting line up for their first game against Matatū, they won 21–10. She also started in their 0–35 thrashing by the Chiefs Manawa in the final round.

Lafaele was named in the Black Ferns squad for the 2022 Pacific Four Series. She made her international debut on 6 June against Australia at Tauranga at the Pacific Four Series. She was recalled into the team for the August test series against the Wallaroos for the Laurie O'Reilly Cup.

References

External links 

 Black Ferns Profile
 Blues Profile

2001 births
Living people
New Zealand female rugby union players
New Zealand women's international rugby union players
People educated at Botany Downs Secondary College
Rugby union flankers